Paprika (US , ; UK) is a spice made from dried and ground red peppers. It is traditionally made from Capsicum annuum varietals in the Longum group, which also includes chili peppers, but the peppers used for paprika tend to be milder and have thinner flesh. In some languages, but not English, the word paprika also refers to the plant and the fruit from which the spice is made, as well as to peppers in the Grossum group (e.g., bell peppers).

All capsicum varieties are descended from wild ancestors in North America, in particular Central Mexico, where they have been cultivated for centuries. The peppers were subsequently introduced to the Old World, when peppers were brought to Spain in the 16th century. The seasoning is used to add color and flavor to many types of dishes in diverse cuisines.

The trade in paprika expanded from the Iberian Peninsula to Africa and Asia and ultimately reached Central Europe through the Balkans, which was then under Ottoman rule. This helps explain the Serbo-Croatian origin of the English term. In Spanish, paprika has been known as pimentón since the 16th century, when it became a typical ingredient in the cuisine of western Extremadura. Despite its presence in Central Europe since the beginning of Ottoman conquests, it did not become popular in Hungary until the late 19th century.

Paprika can range from mild to hot – the flavor also varies from country to country – but almost all plants grown produce the sweet variety. Sweet paprika is mostly composed of the pericarp, with more than half of the seeds removed, whereas hot paprika contains some seeds, stalks, ovules, and calyces. The red, orange or yellow color of paprika is due to its content of carotenoids.

History and etymology

Peppers, the raw material in paprika production, originated from North America, where they grow in the wild in Central Mexico and have for centuries been cultivated by the peoples of Mexico. The peppers were later introduced to the Old World, to Spain in the 16th century, as part of the Columbian exchange. 

The plant used to make the Hungarian version of the spice was grown in 1569 by the Turks at Buda (now part of Budapest, the capital of Hungary). Central European paprika was hot until the 1920s, when a Szeged breeder found a plant that produced sweet fruit, which he grafted onto other plants.

The first recorded use of the word paprika in English is from 1831. Paprika and similar words, including peperke, piperke, and paparka, are used in various languages for bell peppers.

Production and varieties

Paprika is produced in various places including Argentina, Mexico, Hungary, Serbia, Spain, the Netherlands, China, and some regions of the United States.

Hungarian 
Hungary is a major source of paprika, and it is the spice most closely associated with Hungary. The spice was first used in Hungarian cuisine in the early 19th century. It is available in different grades:
 Noble sweet (Édesnemes) – slightly pungent (the most commonly exported paprika; bright red)
 Special quality (különleges) – the mildest (very sweet with a deep bright red color)
 Delicate (csípősmentes csemege) –  a mild paprika with a rich flavor (color from light to dark red)
 Exquisite delicate (csemegepaprika) – similar to delicate, but more pungent
 Pungent exquisite delicate (csípős csemege, pikáns) – an even more pungent version of delicate
 Rose (rózsa) –  with a strong aroma and mild pungency (pale red)
 Semi-sweet (félédes) – a blend of mild and pungent paprikas; medium pungency
 Strong (erős) – the hottest paprika (light brown)

Spanish (pimentón) 
There are three versions of Spanish paprika (pimentón) – mild (pimentón dulce), mildly spicy (pimentón agridulce) and spicy (pimentón picante).

The most common Spanish paprika, pimentón de la Vera, has a distinct smoky flavor and aroma, as it is dried by smoking, typically using oak wood.  Currently, according to the Denomination of Origin Regulation Council (Consejo Regulador de la DOP "Pimentón de La Vera"), the crop of La Vera paprika covers around 1,500 hectares and has an annual production of 4,500,000 kg, certified as Denomination of Origin.

Pimentón de Murcia is an unsmoked variety made with bola/ñora peppers and traditionally dried in the sun or in kilns.

Usage

Culinary 
Paprika is used as an ingredient in numerous dishes throughout the world. It is principally used to season and color rice, stews, and soups, such as goulash, and in the preparation of sausages such as Spanish chorizo, mixed with meats and other spices. The flavor contained within the pepper's oleoresin is more effectively brought out by heating it in oil.

Hungarian national dishes incorporating paprika include gulyás, a meat soup, "pörkölt", a stew called internationally goulash, and paprikash (paprika gravy: a Hungarian recipe combining chicken, broth, paprika, and sour cream). In Moroccan cuisine, paprika (tahmira) is usually augmented by the addition of a small amount of olive oil blended into it. Many dishes call for paprika (colorau) in Portuguese cuisine for taste and color.

Carotenoids
The red, orange, or yellow color of paprika powder derives from its mix of carotenoids. Yellow-orange paprika colors derive primarily from α-carotene and β-carotene (provitamin A compounds), zeaxanthin, lutein and β-cryptoxanthin, whereas red colors derive from capsanthin and capsorubin. One study found high concentrations of zeaxanthin in orange paprika. The same study found that orange paprika contains much more lutein than red or yellow paprika.

Nutrition
In a reference serving amount of one teaspoon (2 grams), paprika supplies 6 calories, is 10% water, and provides 21% of the Daily Value of vitamin A. It provides no other nutrients in significant content.

See also

 Ajvar
 Cayenne pepper
 Chili powder
 Crushed red pepper
 Food powder
 List of Capsicum cultivars
 List of smoked foods
 Paprika Tap de Cortí
 Pimiento

Gallery

References

External links

 

Chili peppers
Medicinal plants
Hungarian cuisine
Bosnia and Herzegovina cuisine
Bulgarian cuisine
Macedonian cuisine
Moroccan cuisine
Portuguese cuisine
Serbian cuisine
Spanish cuisine
Smoked food
Turkish cuisine
Powders
Romani cuisine

ms:Pokok Cili
sq:Speci